Bartlett Arboretum may refer to:

Bartlett Arboretum and Gardens, Stamford, Connecticut
Bartlett Arboretum (Belle Plaine, Kansas), listed on the National Register of Historic Places in Sumner County, Kansas